The Ligier JS P3 is an LMP3 Le Mans Prototype. It was created by Onroak Automotive, and named in partnership with former French driver Guy Ligier. It was built to meet ACO LMP3 standards, and is active in various LMP3 championships worldwide, such as the European Le Mans Series, IMSA Prototype Challenge, and the Asian Le Mans Series. The car has proven to be immensely popular in the category, with over 100 cars being produced since 2015. It has also proved to be one of the most successful prototypes in the class, with a total of 103 overall wins and class victories from 132 races entered by the car. It is set to be succeeded in 2020, by the Ligier JS P320, when new LMP3 regulations are set to come into place.

Development 
In 2014, the ACO announced a new category of Le Mans Prototypes, known as LMP3, which would replace the previous Le Mans Prototype Challenge (LMPC) class in 2015. The number of constructors was limited in the class, with licenses being issued to 6 manufacturers, namely ADESS, Ligier (Onroak Automotive), Ave/Riley, Norma, Dome, as well as Ginetta. Nissan was later announced to be supplying the spec engine, the VK50VE producing 420 hp. The car was launched on the 2nd of February 2015. It was designed primarily in Computational Fluid Dynamics (CFD) using Exa Corporation's PowerFLOW Simulation Software.

Compared to its rivals in the LMP3 class, it has been known to have a lower top speed through speed traps, but is known have an advantage in the corners.

Competition history

2015 
On its debut at the 2015 4 Hours of Estoril, the car finished well, scoring a podium finish at the hands of Graff Racing.

2016 
United Autosports clinched the LMP3 Teams championship with the car, while in the V de V Endurance Series, Inter Europol Competition clinched the LMP3 teams championship.

References 

Le Mans Prototypes
Ligier racing cars